Igors Pavlovs (born 1 January 1965 in Lipetsk, Russian SFSR, USSR) is retired professional Latvian ice hockey player. During his career he played for Dinamo Riga and later for various hockey teams in Germany. He also represented Latvia at international level.

Coaching career 
After retiring as player Pavlovs became the coach of Krefeld Pinguine until he left on 29 April 2009, to join Kölner Haie who released him on 2 December 2009.
In 2010-11 season he became assistant coach for Sibir of KHL. In October 2010, Pavlovs was named head coach of Spartak Moscow after Milos Rziga was fired due to a poor start to the season. In that December, after suffering a serious illness, and the team results not improving, Pavlovs was released from his post and named team scout.  In February, 2011, Pavlovs became head coach of Rapperswil-Jona Lakers

Coaching Clubs 

 2001-2002: Revier Löwen Oberhausen (assistant coach)
 2002-2005: REV Bremerhaven (assistant coach)
 2005-2007: REV Bremerhaven (head coach)
 2007-2008: EV Regensburg
 2008-2009: Krefeld Pinguine
 2009: Kölner Haie
 2010: HC Spartak Moscow

References

External links 
 Eurohockey Profile
 EHCLive: In der Ruhe liegt die Kraft - Igor Pavlov im Live-Interview
 Hockey DB Profile

Latvian ice hockey forwards
German ice hockey forwards
1965 births
Living people
Soviet emigrants to Latvia
German people of Russian descent
Dinamo Riga players
Latvian ice hockey coaches
Soviet ice hockey forwards
Latvian expatriate ice hockey people
Latvian emigrants to Germany
Latvian expatriate sportspeople in Germany
Latvian expatriate sportspeople in the Czech Republic
Latvian expatriate sportspeople in Russia
Latvian expatriate sportspeople in Switzerland
German ice hockey coaches
Expatriate ice hockey players in Germany
Expatriate ice hockey players in the Czech Republic
EHC Freiburg players
HC Vítkovice players
EV Landsberg players
Naturalized citizens of Germany